The Man in the Moon is a 1991 American coming of age drama film. It was the final film directed by Robert Mulligan, from a screenplay written by Jenny Wingfield. It stars Reese Witherspoon in her film debut, Sam Waterston, Tess Harper, Emily Warfield, and Jason London.

The film’s story, set in rural 1950s Louisiana, centers around Dani (Witherspoon), a 14-year-old tomboy who experiences first love and heartbreak when older boy Court (London) moves next door. The film received critical acclaim, making Roger Ebert’s list of the Top 10 Films of 1991.

Plot
In the summer of 1957, Danielle "Dani" Trant is a 14-year-old girl in Louisiana who, according to her father Matthew, is "too small to be running off by herself." Dani and her older sister Maureen, who is going off to college in the fall, are very close. Maureen helps take care of their younger sister, Missy, while their mother Abigail is pregnant.

Dani however prefers to listen to her Elvis Presley records and run off to the neighbor's creek to go skinny dipping. It is here that she meets her new neighbor, 17-year-old Court Foster. Court kicks Dani out of his creek. When Dani goes home, her mother tells her to wash up because an old childhood friend is coming for dinner with her children.

The Trants' old friend turns out to be a widow, Mrs. Foster, with her three sons Court, Dennis, and Rob. When Dani realizes who Court is, the two dislike each other. Court calls Dani "a little girl". When Dani's father Matthew tells Dani to accompany Court into town for groceries, Dani and Court drive into town and start to get along. Dani develops a crush on Court.

Maureen goes on a date to a dance with her boyfriend Billy Sanders. When they leave the dance, Billy wants to park his car and have sex. Maureen gets angry and breaks up with Billy because she believes "love should be beautiful". The next day, Dani asks Maureen for advice on how to kiss a boy. Maureen demonstrates by practicing on her hand.

Dani and Court continue to go swimming during the hot sunny days and become very close friends. The two agree to meet to go swimming at night, since Court has too much work to do during the day. Dani sneaks off and swims with Court until they reach the point where they are about to kiss. Court pushes Dani away and says she is a little girl that doesn't know what she's doing, and runs off home.

Dani leaves too just as a thunderstorm is breaking out. Abigail wakes up and runs outside looking for Dani. Just as Dani gets home and runs to her mother, her mother also runs and trips on a root, falls and hits her head. Dani's father races her to the hospital, where she is kept in order to treat a concussion and toxemia caused by her fall. When her father returns home from the hospital, he spanks Dani with his belt.

The next day, Court brings food to the Trant house and apologizes to Dani for the other night. Dani, still hurt, just ignores him at first, until Court says he would still like to be friends. The next time they go swimming the two share Dani's first kiss. Dani is still hurt and angry at her father for hitting her. When he tries to talk to her the next day feeling remorseful for using his belt on her, she only replies with "Yes Sir" or "No Sir" to his questions.

Once Dani has made up with her father, he tells Dani to invite Court over once in a while so he can get to know him better. When Court comes over for dinner, he finally meets Maureen. Dani can tell it is love at first sight for the two of them and now feels like the odd one out. While Dani visits her mother in the hospital, Court shows up at the Trant house where Maureen is home babysitting Missy. Though initially reluctant to return Court’s affections because she knows about Dani’s feelings for Court, Maureen gives in and she and Court kiss.

Over the next few days, Dani is getting pushed away by Court. While the rest of the family goes to pick up Abigail and the new baby from the hospital, Court and Maureen proclaim their love for each other, consummating their love in a field. When Maureen sneaks back home, she is caught by Dani. Dani realizes Maureen was with Court, and angry at her sister’s betrayal, she runs towards Court’s farm alone. Meanwhile, Court has been plowing the fields and, distracted by daydreams of Maureen, falls off his tractor and gets into an accident. Dani arrives at Court’s, greeted with the sight of Court badly injured in the field cradled by his inconsolable mother. Dani races home to tell her father.

When Matthew returns home, he has some of Court's blood on his clothes and the family realizes that Court has died. Maureen hides her pain at first, while Dani bursts into tears. After Court's funeral, Dani continues to be angry at Maureen for stealing Court away from her. Matthew tells Dani that although she has a right to be hurt, being mad won't bring Court back, and Maureen will be her sister for life. Dani comforts Maureen as she weeps on Court's fresh grave, and the film ends with Maureen and Dani talking on the porch at night as the summer draws to a close, looking up at the moon, becoming close again.

Cast

Production
The Man in the Moon marked the film debut of then 14-year-old Reese Witherspoon. Director Mulligan commented that casting her in the role of Dani was:
 The cinematography was by Academy Award-winning cinematographer Freddie Francis.

Reception 
On Rotten Tomatoes the film has a rating of 91% based on 22 reviews, with a consensus that reads: "It's sentimental, and some viewers may feel manipulated by the melodramatic final act, but The Man in the Moon offers a finely drawn coming-of-age story with an excellent cast—including Reese Witherspoon in her film debut." On Metacritic it has a score of 73% based on reviews from 18 critics, indicating "generally favorable reviews".

Janet Maslin of The New York Times praised the performances of Waterston, Harper, and Strickland. Maslin also wrote, “Mr. Mulligan also gets an outstandingly natural performance out of Miss Witherspoon, who has no trouble carrying a lot of the film single-handedly. It falls to her to remind the audience that this story is at heart about a family, and she does.”

The film was highly praised by Roger Ebert, who awarded the film four stars in his review and included it at No. 8 in his Top 10 list of the best films of 1991, declaring:

Versions 
Later, Mulligan became disenchanted with how the film was edited and cut by airlines, particularly American and Delta Air Lines, for in-flight showings. He became so disturbed by these airline edits to the picture that he insisted that his name be removed from the credits of the film.

References

External links

 
 
 
 

1991 films
1991 romantic drama films
American coming-of-age films
American romantic drama films
1990s English-language films
Films set in Louisiana
Films scored by James Newton Howard
Films directed by Robert Mulligan
Films set in 1957
Metro-Goldwyn-Mayer films
1990s teen romance films
1990s coming-of-age films
Films about sisters
Films about father–daughter relationships
Films about families
1990s coming-of-age drama films
Films about puberty
1990s American films
American teen romance films